Guns of Hate is a 1948 Western film directed by Lesley Selander featuring RKO's Western stars Tim Holt, with Nan Leslie and Richard Martin.

Plot
Bob and Chito are two unemployed and down on their luck travelling wranglers who help an older man, Ben Jason, replace the broken wheel on his wagon in a desolate part of Arizona.  For their generosity, they are given a gold nugget and an offer of "pick and shovel" work on Ben's place.  Visiting Matt Wyatt, an assayer in the nearest town, Bob and Chito are told that the nugget is of such purity that it must be from the Lost Dutchman's Gold Mine, a long lost mine that became a legend due to its wealth.  Chito reveals that Ben Jason gave them the nugget.  Matt schemes with the town boss, Anse Morgan to steal the map of the mine from Ben before he stakes his claim.  Ben is murdered with Bob and Chito blamed by Ben's daughter Judy.  Bob and Chito break jail and set matters right.

Cast

References

External list
Guns of Hate at IMDb
Review of film at Variety

1948 films
American Western (genre) films
1948 Western (genre) films
American black-and-white films
Films directed by Lesley Selander
RKO Pictures films
Films scored by Paul Sawtell
1940s English-language films
1940s American films